James C. O'Brien is an American attorney and diplomat who serves as the head of the Office of Sanctions Coordination in the Biden administration since April 2022. He previously served as the special envoy for hostage affairs from August 28, 2015, to January 20, 2017.

Education
In 1978, O'Brien graduated from Creighton Preparatory School in Omaha, Nebraska. He earned a Bachelor of Arts degree from Macalester College, Master of Arts from the University of Pittsburgh, and Juris Doctor from Yale Law School.

Career
O'Brien joined the United States Department of State in 1989 as an attorney and diplomatic advisor. He later served as Special Presidential Envoy for the Balkans, Deputy Director of the State Department's Office of Policy Planning, and as a senior adviser to the Ambassador to the United Nations and Secretary of State Madeleine Albright. O'Brien also had a role in managing the Dayton Agreement, a peace deal between Bosnia, Croatia, and Serbia.

From August 28, 2015 to January 20, 2017, O'Brien served as the first special envoy for hostage affairs in the Obama administration. Since leaving his position, O'Brien has worked as a co-founder and principal at the Albright Stonebridge Group.

In October 2021, O'Brien was nominated to serve as Head of the Office of Sanctions Coordination in the Biden administration, a position with the rank of ambassador. On April 6, 2022, his nomination was confirmed in the United States Senate by a 71–26 vote. 

O'Brien was sworn in on April 14, 2022.

References

Living people
Macalester College alumni
University of Pittsburgh alumni
Yale Law School alumni
United States Special Envoys
Obama administration personnel
Biden administration personnel
20th-century American lawyers
21st-century American diplomats
Year of birth missing (living people)
Place of birth missing (living people)